These are the former and current buildings and structures of Towson University and its predecessor institutions.

Former locations

These buildings are located in Baltimore, Maryland. The School/College/University was housed in them at separate periods before the institution moved to its current suburban location, north of the City of Baltimore in north-central Baltimore County in the county seat of Towson, Maryland in September 1915.

Former buildings

Academic and administrative

Non-academic

Residence buildings

Dining halls and facilities

Campus landmarks

History

Administration Hall (now Stephens Hall), Newell Hall, and the Power Plant were the first three original buildings built on the suburban Baltimore County campus in 1913-1915, which opened September 1915, facing York Road.

In 1936, the Works Progress Administration (W.P.A.), part of Roosevelt's "New Deal" program, had spent over $55,000 in its work on "The Glen". It included lodges which were used for open air classes and meetings, a council ring for ceremonies, and an amphitheater.

The original Lida Lee Tall building was renamed Van Bokkelen Hall in 1960, after the man and Episcopal priest, Libertus Van Bokkelen,  who was authorized by the new third Maryland Constitution of 1864 and first served as Maryland State Superintendent of Public Instruction, in 1865, heading the developing, supervision and advising of public school systems for the various counties and funded the new Maryland State Normal School (M.S.N.S.).

After the school was moved to Towson in 1914-1915, Richmond became the first principal to live in the white, colonial style house "Glen Esk" (now near Prettyman Hall). This was the residence of one of the estates existing on the land facing York Road, south of old Towsontown that was secured for the school. However, in 1970, President James Fisher became the last to live in the "Glen Esk" house since the school moved to Towson. Because it was no longer suitable for a family, as students were occasionally found passed out on the lawn, it was eventually turned into the Counseling Center.

In 1971, as Earle T. Hawkins, former president of Towson State University, researched the school's history, he became especially interested in the meaning of the name of the house, "Glen Esk", now the counseling center. Hawkins published an article in The Baltimore Sun, in which he suggested he was trying to solve this mystery. In response, he received a letter from the wine and spirits importers Maynard and Child, Inc. of Scotland, who included a label from their brand of whiskey called "Glen Esk."

The Cook Library occupies space that was once a gymnasium. Prior to its opening, the current Media Center served as the Library.

George LaTour Smith, (whom Smith Hall is named after), died on his way home after getting hit by a locomotive. The administration felt that it was respectful to name the building in his honor.

Notable people

J. Charles Linthicum, of Linthicum, Maryland in Anne Arundel County, a graduate who served in the U.S. House of Representatives and pushed the bill to make the "Star Spangled Banner" the national anthem in March 1931.
 Dr. M. Bates Stephens, former Maryland State Superintendent.
Libertus Van Bokkelen, first head of Maryland State School system, founded the Normal School.
George L. Smith, the first head of the science department at the Normal School.
Albert S. Cook, former Maryland State Superintendent for 21 years.
Anita S. Dowell, a former faculty member and former Dean of the college, was largely responsible for the health instruction program of the college structured in 1953.
Dr. Donald Minnegan served over 45 years at Towson, and was the only men's physical education faculty member for many of those years. Hawkins thought it would be fitting for the future field house to be named for him.

Presidents/Principals with buildings named after them

References

Towson University